Sand pea is a common name for several plants and may refer to:

Eriosema
Lathyrus japonicus